Meri Helena Ranta (born 11 June 1946) is a Finnish forensic dentist. She became well known as a result of her contributions to several international forensic investigations of conflict situations, such as those in Kosovo. She testified at the trial of former Yugoslav president Slobodan Milošević after her forensic work in the Kosovo village of Racak.

Ranta was part of the team that investigated alleged Israeli massacres in the Palestinian refugee camp of Jenin.

In addition to her forensic work, she is a lecturer at the University of Helsinki, a rare case of a licentiate holding a post usually reserved for those with research doctorates.

Ranta has worked in Bosnia and Herzegovina (1996–1997), Kosovo (1998–2001), Cameroon (2002), Peru (2002), Iraq (2004), Southeast Asia (2005), Chechnya, Peru and Colombia.

References

1946 births
Living people

Academic staff of the University of Helsinki

Finnish scientists
Forensic scientists
Finnish dentists
Women forensic scientists
Place of birth missing (living people)
Finnish women academics
Finnish women scientists
Finnish expatriates in Cameroon
Finnish expatriates in Colombia
Finnish expatriates in Iraq
Finnish expatriates in Kosovo
Finnish expatriates in Peru
Finnish expatriates in Bosnia and Herzegovina
Finnish expatriates in Israel
Finnish expatriates in Russia